Luis Ángel Sánchez (born 15 December 1993) is a male Guatemalan racewalker. He competed in the 50 kilometres walk event at the 2015 World Championships in Athletics in Beijing, China, finishing the 36th.

He has qualified to represent Guatemala at the 2020 Summer Olympics.

See also
 Guatemala at the 2015 World Championships in Athletics

References

1993 births
Living people
Place of birth missing (living people)
Guatemalan male racewalkers
World Athletics Championships athletes for Guatemala
Olympic athletes of Guatemala
Athletes (track and field) at the 2020 Summer Olympics
Sportspeople from Guatemala City
20th-century Guatemalan people
21st-century Guatemalan people